Vernon Joseph Bourke (1907–1998) was a Canadian-born American Thomist philosopher and professor at Saint Louis University.  His area of expertise was ethics, and especially the moral philosophy of Augustine of Hippo and Thomas Aquinas.

Early life
Bourke was born in North Bay, Ontario, Canada in 1907. He attended  St. Michael's College in Toronto, winning the Cardinal Mercier and Governor General's medals in the philosophy honors course.  He received his B.A. in 1928 and then entered the School of Graduate Studies at the University of Toronto.  He was among the first to attend the Pontifical Institute of Mediaeval Studies where he worked under Etienne Gilson.  He earned his M.A. in 1929 during which time he taught ancient philosophy at St. Michael's College from 1928 to 1931.

In 1931, he joined the faculty of St. Louis University as instructor of philosophy.  He earned his Ph.D. in 1937 and became an assistant professor of philosophy in 1938, an associate professor in 1942, and full professor in 1946.

Family life
Bourke married in 1948.  He and his wife Janet (d. December 1997), were parents of two daughters and a son, grandparents to eight, and great-grandparents to two.

Bourke was a practicing Roman Catholic.

He died on May 4, 1998.

Academic career
After obtaining a PhD at the University of Toronto in Toronto, Ontario, Canada, Bourke went on to teach at Saint Louis University in Missouri from 1931 to 1975. During the 1930s he became the University's first hockey coach. 
Bourke was the President of the  American Catholic Philosophical Association in 1948 and an honorary member of the Order of St. Augustine.  He was a member of the Natural Law Board at the University of Notre Dame and belonged to the Phi Beta Kappa fraternity.

Published works
Bourke authored, co-authored, and edited numerous books and articles, including the following:

Aquinas's Search for Wisdom
Augustine’s Quest for Wisdom: Life and Philosophy of the Bishop of Hippo

Ethics in Crisis
Ethics: A Textbook in Moral Philosophy
History of Ethics (2 vols.)
Joy in St. Augustine
St. Thomas and the Greek Moralists
 
Will in Western Thought: A Historico-Critical Survey
Wisdom of Augustine

References

External links
http://www.librarything.com/author/bourkevernonj
http://www.axiospress.com/books/History%20of%20EthicsVolume%202/Excerpts.html
http://philpapers.org/s/Vernon%20J.%20Bourke

1907 births
1998 deaths
Saint Louis University faculty
American philosophy academics
University of Toronto alumni
Thomists
American ethicists
People from North Bay, Ontario
Scholars of medieval philosophy
Historians of philosophy
Canadian philosophers
20th-century American philosophers
Catholic philosophers
20th-century American historians